Nyamagabe is a district (akarere) in Southern Province, Rwanda. Its capital is Gasaka.

Geography, flora and fauna 
The district lies between Butare and Cyangugu in the south-west of Rwanda, and contains much of the former Gikongoro Province, which was disbanded in 2006. It also contains the eastern half of Nyungwe Forest, a popular tourist destination, being one of the last remaining forest areas of Rwanda and home to chimpanzees and many other species of primate.

Sectors 
Nyamagabe district is divided into 17 sectors (imirenge): Buruhukiro, Cyanika, Gatare, Kaduha, Kamegeli, Kibirizi, Kibumbwe, Kitabi, Mbazi, Mugano, Musange, Musebeya, Mushubi, Nkomane, Gasaka, Tare and Uwinkingi.

Kigeme refugee camp 
The Kigeme refugee camp is located in the district. A Turi Kumwe Centre, housing "a Police post as well as migration and camp management offices" was opened in the camp in 2014.

References 

 
 Inzego.doc — Province, District and Sector information from MINALOC, the Rwanda ministry of local government.

Districts of Rwanda
Refugee camps in Rwanda